Almedin Fetahović (born 19 May 1964) is a Bosnian professional boxing coach and former amateur boxer.

He is best known for winning the gold medal at the 1993 Mediterranean Games in France. It was the first gold medal ever for Bosnia and Herzegovina at a major international multi-sport event. 

In the quarterfinals of the -71kg category Fetahović defeated 1995 All-Africa Games Gold medalist Mohamed Marmouri, while in the semifinals he beat 1992 European Junior Championships Bronze medalist Salvatore Munno.

In the finals he defeated 1996 Olympic silver medalist Malik Beyleroğlu. The final result was 12:8. .

In 1989, he won the Yugoslav National Championship in Welterweight. At the 1995 World Amateur Boxing Championships in Berlin, Fetahović defeated Lawrence Murphy from Scotland and lost to Józef Gilewski from Poland.

Achievements and awards
1993
 Mediterranean Games – Languedoc-Roussillon, FRA – Light middleweight

Awards
Bosnia and Herzegovina Coach of the Year: 2008

References

1964 births
Living people
Sportspeople from Sarajevo
Yugoslav male boxers
Bosnia and Herzegovina male boxers
Welterweight boxers
Competitors at the 1993 Mediterranean Games
Mediterranean Games medalists in boxing
Mediterranean Games gold medalists for Bosnia and Herzegovina
Bosnia and Herzegovina boxing coaches